Tyler Michael Thornburg (born September 29, 1988) is an American professional baseball pitcher who is currently a free agent. He has previously played in MLB for the Milwaukee Brewers, Boston Red Sox, Cincinnati Reds, and Atlanta Braves.

Early life
At the age of 12, Thornburg played as an outfielder in little league baseball for the Sandy Springs All-Stars, who won the Georgia state championship, and reached the 2001 Southeast Regional final of the Little League World Series.

Amateur career
Thornburg attended Riverwood High School in Sandy Springs, Georgia, where he played for the school's baseball team. He then enrolled in Charleston Southern University, where he played college baseball for the Buccaneers, a member of the Big South Conference within NCAA Division I. With the Buccaneers, Thornburg played as a pitcher and outfielder. In the summer of 2008, Thornburg played collegiate summer baseball for the Winchester Royals of the Valley Baseball League in Virginia; he recorded a 1.48 ERA in  innings pitched, and was named to the league's First Team. He played for the Brewster Whitecaps of the Cape Cod Baseball League in the summer of 2009. In 2010, Thornburg was twice named the Big South pitcher of the week.

Professional career

Milwaukee Brewers
The Milwaukee Brewers drafted Thornburg in the third round, with the 96th overall selection, of the 2010 Major League Baseball Draft.

Minor League Baseball
Thornburg signed with the Brewers and pitched during the 2010 season for the Helena Brewers in the Rookie-level Pioneer League. Thornburg began the 2011 season with the Wisconsin Timber Rattlers of the Class A Midwest League, then received a promotion to the Brevard County Manatees of the Class A-Advanced Florida State League (FSL). Thornburg had a 7–0 win–loss record and 1.50 earned run average (ERA) with Wisconsin, and represented the Timber Rattlers in the Midwest League All-Star Game. He was named FSL pitcher of the week in his first week after the promotion. Thornburg participated in the 2011 All-Star Futures Game.

MLB.com ranked Thornburg as the Brewers' fourth best prospect heading into the 2012 season. The Brewers assigned Thornburg to the Huntsville Stars of the Class AA Southern League. He had an 8–1 record with a 3.00 ERA in 13 games started, and was named the Brewers' minor league pitcher of the month for May 2012. He was also selected to appear in the Southern League All-Star Game. However, instead of making an All-Star Game appearance, Thornburg was promoted to the major leagues.

2012
Thornburg made his debut for the Brewers on June 19, 2012, against the Toronto Blue Jays. He was called up to make an emergency start, for the injured Shaun Marcum. In his debut, Thorburg allowed back-to-back-to-back home runs to Colby Rasmus, José Bautista, and Edwin Encarnación. He also collected his first major league hit with a double to left center in his first major league at bat. He was assigned to the Nashville Sounds of the Class AAA Pacific Coast League after the game. He made additional MLB appearances in July, and then late in the season. Overall, with the 2012 Brewers, Thornburg appeared in eight games (three starts) without a win or loss, with a 4.50 ERA and 20 strikeouts and seven walks in 22 innings pitched.

2013
Thornburg appeared in three games with the Brewers during spring training in 2013, but was cut on March 11 and assigned to Nashville. He was the Sounds' Opening Day starter, pitching five innings and giving up one run, earning a no decision. On June 5, Thornburg was recalled, replacing the injured Marco Estrada; at the time, Thornburg was 0–7 with a 6.75 ERA in 12 starts with Nashville. Thornburg pitched that day against the Oakland Athletics, providing two scoreless innings of relief in the 6–1 loss. He recorded his first win in his next appearance, pitching two scoreless innings against the Philadelphia Phillies on June 8. After the game, Thornburg was optioned back to Nashville, when Jim Henderson was activated off the disabled list. Thornburg made three more starts with Nashville before being recalled on June 29, replacing Caleb Gindl. He spent the rest of the season with Milwaukee. Overall, in 18 games (seven starts) with the 2013 Brewers, Thornburg went 3–1 with a 2.03 ERA, striking out 48 and walking 26 in  innings.

2014
In 2014, Thornburg began the season in the Brewers' bullpen before suffering a season-ending elbow injury in June. With the 2014 Brewers, Thornburg made 27 appearances, all in relief, compiling a 3–1 record with 4.25 ERA with 28 strikeouts and 21 walks in  innings pitched.

2015
After starting the 2015 season with Milwaukee, Thornburg spent three months in Triple-A regaining his arm strength, before being recalled at the end of July. With the 2015 Brewers, Thornburg made 24 appearances, all in relief, compiling an 0–2 record with 3.67 ERA, 34 strikeouts, and 12 walks in  innings pitched.

2016
He set the Brewers franchise record for consecutive innings without allowing a baserunner by a relief pitcher. With the 2016 Brewers, Thornburg made a career-high 67 appearances, all in relief, compiling an 8–5 record with 2.15 ERA, 90 strikeouts, and 25 walks in 67 innings pitched.

Overall, in parts of five seasons with Milwaukee, Thornburg appeared in 144 games (ten starts), compiling a 14–9 record with 2.87 ERA; he had 220 strikeouts and 91 walks in  innings pitched.

Boston Red Sox
On December 6, 2016, the Brewers traded Thornburg to the Boston Red Sox for Travis Shaw, Mauricio Dubon, Josh Pennington and a player to be named later. The Red Sox compleited the trade in June 2017, sending Yeison Coca to the Brewers.

Thornburg started the 2017 season on the disabled list with a shoulder injury, and in June was diagnosed with thoracic outlet syndrome, requiring surgery; as a result, he missed the entire season.

In 2018, Thornburg's recovery from surgery resulted in him missing spring training. He joined the Triple-A Pawtucket Red Sox at the start of May, for a rehabilitation assignment. That assignment was stopped after nine appearances, and Thornburg started a new rehabilitation assignment on June 2, pitching in both Double-A and Triple-A. During his rehabilitation assignments, Thornburg made 18 total appearances (one start), compiling an 0–1 record with 4.96 ERA, 16 strikeouts, and eight walks in  innings pitched. Thornburg was added to Boston's active roster on July 4, and he made his debut with the Red Sox on July 6, allowing one hit and one run in an inning pitched against the Kansas City Royals. Overall with the 2018 Red Sox, Thornburg made 25 relief appearances, compiling a 2–0 record and 5.63 ERA with 21 strikeouts in 24 innings. He was not included on Boston's postseason roster.

On November 30, 2018, the Red Sox re-signed Thornburg to a one-year contract worth $1.75 million, plus incentives worth up to $400,000. Thornburg was included on Boston's Opening Day roster to start the 2019 season. Through May 22, he had 16 appearances, recording 22 strikeouts and 10 walks in  innings with a 7.71 ERA and no decisions. On May 23, Thornburg was placed on the 10-day injured list with a right hip impingement. He was sent on a rehabilitation assignment with Pawtucket on June 9. After being activated from the injured list, Thornburg declined a minor league assignment and was released by the Red Sox on July 10.

Los Angeles Dodgers
Thornburg signed a minor league contract with the Los Angeles Dodgers sometime before the All-Star break. He was assigned to the Triple-A Oklahoma City Dodgers. He elected free agency following the 2019 season.

Cincinnati Reds
On December 31, 2019, Thornburg signed a minor league deal with the Cincinnati Reds that included an invitation to Spring Training. On August 14, 2020, the Reds selected Thornburg to the active roster. In mid-September 2020, Thornburg underwent Tommy John surgery.

Atlanta Braves
On March 16, 2022, Thornburg signed a one-year, non-guaranteed major-league contract worth $900,000 with the Atlanta Braves. He was placed on the Opening Day roster. The Braves designated Thornburg for assignment on May 23. He was released on May 28, 2022.

Minnesota Twins
On June 6, 2022, Thornburg signed a minor league deal with the Minnesota Twins. After he appeared in two games for the St. Paul Saints, the Twins promoted him to the major leagues on June 12. He was designated for assignment on July 1. He was released on September 5, 2022.

Scouting report
Thornburg has a  fastball. Due to his velocity, size, over-the-top delivery, and repertoire, he has drawn favorable comparisons to Tim Lincecum. He throws two off-speed pitches, including a strong power curveball in the upper-70s, and a sinking change-up in the low-80s.

His curveball is his primary off-speed pitch.

References

External links

1988 births
Living people
Major League Baseball pitchers
Milwaukee Brewers players
Boston Red Sox players
Cincinnati Reds players
Atlanta Braves players
Minnesota Twins players
Charleston Southern Buccaneers baseball players
Brewster Whitecaps players
Helena Brewers players
Wisconsin Timber Rattlers players
Brevard County Manatees players
Baseball players from Texas
Huntsville Stars players
Nashville Sounds players
People from Sandy Springs, Georgia
Peoria Javelinas players
Pawtucket Red Sox players
Portland Sea Dogs players
Sportspeople from Fulton County, Georgia
Oklahoma City Dodgers players
St. Paul Saints players